Kokan Shiren (Japanese: こかんしれん, Kanji: 虎関師錬; 9 May 1278 – 11 August 1347), Japanese Rinzai Zen patriarch and celebrated poet. He preached Buddhism at the Imperial court, and was noted for his poetry in the Literature of the Five Mountains (Gozan bungaku) tradition. He was the compiler of a thirty-chapter Buddhist history, the Genko Shakusho, the oldest extant account of Buddhism in Japan.

Biography

Kokan was the son of an officer of the palace guard and a mother of the aristocratic Minamoto clan. At age eight he was placed in the charge of the Buddhist priest Hōkaku on Mt. Hiei. At age ten he was ordained there, but later began study with the Zen master Kian at the Nanzenji monastery. Kokan Shiren's talents came to the attention of the Emperor Kameyama. At age seventeen he began extensive Chinese studies. Thus began a long career of travel and the establishment of Zen institutions all across Japan. He became abbot at many of the best Zen establishments. At the end of his life, the emperor Gomurakami conferred upon him the title kokushi or National Teacher. Yet in his writings Kokan showed an aloofness from prestige with a striving for inner freedom. The best of his poetry in Chinese dates from late in his life when he had withdrawn from ecclesiastical affairs. His poetry and essays were collected under the title Saihokushū.  He is also credited with other contributions to lexography in his lifetime.

Kokan studied under the celebrated Chinese monk Yishan Yining. Their relationship can be regarded as the beginning of the golden age of the Literature of the Five Mountains in Japan. He studied calligraphy under an additional Chinese master Huang Shangu.  Other works include Japan's first rhymed verse Jubun-in-ryaku in five volumes, Kokan Osho Juzenshiroku in three volumes, and the eighteen-volume  Butsugo Shinron. A portrait of Kokan Shiren is in the Kaizoin of the Tōfuku-ji Temple in Kyoto, Japan.

Kokan is noted for writing the Genko Shakusho, the oldest extant account of Buddhism in Japan. In the introduction to the work, Kokan wrote that he was shamed into writing it after the Chinese monk Yishan Yining expressed his surprise that no such history existed in Japan. In 1322, he completed the Genko Shakusho; it was completed in the Genko era, whence the era name in its title.

Rhymeprose on a Miniature Landscape Garden

Of great interest for the development of  the Japanese garden, bonseki, bonsai and related arts is Kokan Shirens rhymeprose essay  Rhymeprose on a Miniature Landscape Garden. Obvious influence can be seen from Chinese Song period literati. Kokan Shiren's deceptively simple and straightforward narration gave an early voice to what would become a profound cultural transformation in Japan:

See also
List of Rinzai Buddhists

Notes

References
 Carpenter, Bruce E., "Kokan Shiren and the Transformation of Familiar Things," Tezukayama University Review (Tezukayama daigaku ronshū (Nara, Japan), No. 18, 1978,  pp. 1–16.
 Kitamura, Sawakichi. (1941).  Gozan bungaku shiko (A Draft History of Five Mountains Literature).  Tokyo: Fujiyama Press. 
 Yamane Yuzo. (1983). "Five Mountains of Kyoto" (Kyo no Gozan), in the Complete Arts of Japanese Ancient Temples.  Tokyo: Shueisha Press.

1278 births
1347 deaths
Rinzai Buddhists
Japanese Zen Buddhists
Kamakura period Buddhist clergy
14th-century Japanese historians
People from Kyoto Prefecture
Writers from Kyoto Prefecture
People from Kyoto
Writers from Kyoto